The 1997 Ulster Senior Football Championship Final was played at St Tiernach's Park in Clones on 20 July 1997. It was contested by Cavan and Derry.

Cavan were looking for their first title since 1969, while Derry hadn't won since 1993.

Cavan entered the game as underdogs, but bridged a 28-year gap to win a record 39th Ulster title. Substitute Jason O'Reilly got the decisive goal, while Ronan Carolan was top scorer with 6 points. Dermot McCabe was selected as man of the match while Stephen King had the honour of lifting the Anglo-Celt Cup as captain.

Match details

References

Ulster Football Final
Ulster GAA Football Final
Cavan county football team matches
Derry county football team matches
Ulster Senior Football Championship Finals